Peduase is a town in the Akuapim South Municipal District of the Eastern Region of south Ghana and famous for the Peduase Lodge. It shares borders with Ayi Mensa which is one of the entry points  from Accra to Akuapem.

Peduase Lodge 
Peduase is the location of a Presidential summer residence ('Peduase Lodge') built and first used by Ghana's first President, Kwame Nkrumah.It was used in the second republic of Ghana as the official residence of the then Ceremonial President, Edward Akufo-Addo.Since then it has not been permanently resided in by any Ghanaian head-of-state.

Peduase Lodge is still used as a Presidential accommodation for the state of Ghana guests. The Presidential Lodge is in Peduase, a town near Kitase on the road to Aburi.

Notable places 

 Peduase Logde
 Peduase valley resort

References 

Populated places in the Eastern Region (Ghana)
Villages in Ghana